Robinvale station in Robinvale, Victoria, Australia, is the terminus of the Robinvale railway line. Since the termination of passenger service on the line in 1978, the station only sees freight services, although the station platform is currently intact.

Disused railway stations in Victoria (Australia)